We Have Been Watching is an entertainment programme commissioned by Gold first broadcast on 4 January 2017, although a Christmas Special pilot was aired on 30 November 2016. The show is much in the style of Gogglebox but with comedians and comedy actors offering their insights on the nation's best loved comedy scenes.

Comedians featured 
 John Challis & Sue Holderness (Only Fools and Horses)
 Sally Phillips & Sarah Hadland (Miranda)
 Ricky Tomlinson & Ralf Little (The Royle Family)
 Russell Tovey and Sarah Solemani (Him & Her)
 Johnny Vegas (Benidorm) & Jo Joyner 
 Mathew Baynton & Jim Howick (Horrible Histories)
 Craig Charles & Robert Llewellyn (Red Dwarf)
 Richard Herring & David Baddiel
 Nigel Planer & Adil Ray (Citizen Khan)
 Maxine Peake & Diane Morgan (Funny Cow)
 James Acaster & Nish Kumar
 Josie Lawrence & Meera Syal
 Larry Lamb & Zoe Lyons

Episodes

References

External links
 
 
 

2016 British television series debuts
2017 British television series endings
2010s British comedy television series
English-language television shows
Gold (British TV channel) original programming
Television series about television